Kippo is a medium-interaction SSH honeypot written in Python. Kippo is used to log brute force attacks and the entire shell interaction performed by an attacker. It is inspired by Kojoney. The source code is released under the New BSD License.

Kippo is no longer under active development  and recommends using the fork'd project Cowrie.

Python Dependencies

 Python Twisted 
 Twisted Conch 
 Python 2.5+ but less than 3.0
 Python-dev 
 Pysan1
 Python-OpenSSL
 PyCrypto
 MySql Python

References

External links
Kippo at GitHub
Kippo (Old homepage) at GoogleCode
 Cowrie - Active Kippo Fork at GitHub
Kojoney - A honeypot for the SSH Service

Python (programming language) software